Lgota Wielka  is a village in Radomsko County, Łódź Voivodeship, in central Poland. It is the seat of the gmina (administrative district) called Gmina Lgota Wielka.

The village has a population of 636.

References

Villages in Radomsko County